Russian television may refer to:
 Television in Russia
 Russian Television International
 Russia TV Channel